Rustington is an electoral division of West Sussex in England and returns one member to sit on West Sussex County Council.

Extent
The division covers the village of Rustington, which forms part of the urban area of the town of Littlehampton.

It comprises the following Arun District wards: Rustington East Ward and the south part of Rustington West Ward; and falls entirely within the civil parish of Rustington.

Election results

2017 Election
Results of the election held on 4 May 2017:

2013 Election
Results of the election held on 2 May 2013:

2009 Election
Results of the election held on 4 June 2009:

2005 Election
Results of the election held on 5 May 2005:

References
Election Results - West Sussex County Council

External links
 West Sussex County Council
 Election Maps

Electoral Divisions of West Sussex